Seyyed Mohammad Taqi Ghazanfari (April 1886 – March 1971) was a Shia jurist of the fourteenth century AH. He was born in May 1882 AD in Khansar. He was one of the first people who stood in the contemporary period for Friday Prayers.

Early life 
His father, Seyyed Hashim Mousavi Khansari, was a recognized scholar in  Borujerd and Isfahan seminaries. Professors included Seyed Mahmoud Tabatabai Boroujerdi and Seyed Mirza Muhammad Taqi, due to the seventh Shiite imam Musa al-Kazim.

Education 

He finished his primary education in his hometown of Khansar. He studied under Seyyed Mohammad Taqi Khansari and Seyed Mahmoud Ibn al-Reza Khansari. He traveled to Najaf for further study with Abdul-Karim Ha'eri Yazdi, Muhammad Hossein Naini, Abu l-Hasan al-Isfahani and Sayyid Abu Turab Khansari. He traveled to Qom and the pilgrimage threshold Fātimah bint Mūsā visiting holy shrines, and clerics including Shahab al-Din Marashi Najafi and Mohammad Kazem Shariatmadari.

Accomplishments 
 Khansar renew religious site
 Rebuild the Dorah mosque Khansar
 Saqakhaneh building in Khansar
 Renew two bathrooms for men and women

Family

Children 
 Seyyed Mehdi Ghazanfari
 Seyed Mohammad Hashemi Ghazanfari
 Seyyed Reza Ghazanfari
 Vajiehossadat Ghazanfari

Grandchildren 

 Ismail Ghazanfari
 Seyyed Mohammad Ghazanfari
 Aqa Seyyed Hadi Ghazanfari Khansari
 Seyyed Mohsen Ghazanfari
 Syed Taqi Ghazanfari
 Seyed Jafar Ghazanfari

Death 
Mohammad Taqi Khansari died in March 1971 after a lifetime of religious service in Khansar.

References 

1886 births
1971 deaths
People from Khansar
Al-Moussawi family
Iranian Shia scholars of Islam